Garry Paul Hunter (born 1 January 1985) is a former English professional footballer. The majority of Hunter's career was spent with Morecambe, with whom he played over 300 times in all competitions. He also had a season at Barrow.

Hunter spent the first nine years of his career with Morecambe after joining from the club's academy, making his Conference debut on 23 August 2003 when he was a second-half substitute for Garry Thompson in Morecambe's 3–2 win at home to Dagenham & Redbridge. He was a member of the Morecambe side that won promotion to the Football League in 2007, playing as a substitute in the play-off final victory over Exeter City.

Hunter remained with Morecambe as they entered the Football League and made his league debut on 11 August 2007 in the goalless draw at home to Barnet.

References

External links

Morecambe FC player profile

1985 births
Living people
Sportspeople from Morecambe
English footballers
Association football midfielders
Morecambe F.C. players
Barrow A.F.C. players
English Football League players
National League (English football) players
Lancaster City F.C. players
Northern Premier League players